The Hits Album 10 or Hits 10 is the tenth release of the Hits compilation series, compiled by BMG, CBS and WEA. It was released in the UK on 22 May 1989. With this release, the compilers returned to the tradition of a volume issue number and the revival of artwork used from Hits 6 to Hits 8, with the issue number forming a central graphic against a black background. It was a successful album and reached number one on the UK Compilation Album chart for six consecutive weeks and achieved a Platinum sales award.

This would be the last release in the Hits series, for the time being, to follow the  chronological volume number which had been in place from its launch in 1984. From now on, there would be several rebrands and relaunches of the Hits series, including the return to sequential numbering, picking it back up at Hits 50 twelve years later, around the same time as Now 50 in 2001.

Hits 10 features one song which reached number one on the UK Singles Chart: "Eternal Flame".

A 16-track video compilation, titled The Hits 10 Video Selection was also released on VHS by CBS Music Video. All tracks on the video are featured on the album.

Track listing

CD/Record/Tape 1

 The Bangles - "Eternal Flame"
 Donna Summer - "This Time I Know It's for Real"
 Kon Kan - "I Beg Your Pardon"
 Coldcut featuring Lisa Stansfield - "People Hold On"
 The Four Tops and Smokey Robinson - "Indestructible"
 Boy Meets Girl - "Waiting for a Star to Fall"
 London Boys - "Requiem (Hamburg Edit)"
 Fuzzbox - "Pink Sunshine"
 Simply Red - "If You Don't Know Me by Now"
 De La Soul - "Me Myself and I"
 Robert Howard and Kym Mazelle - "Wait"
 Bobby Brown - "Don't Be Cruel"
 Ten City - "That's the Way Love Is (Deep House Mix)"
 The Funky Worm - "U + Me = Love"
 Jomanda - "Make My Body Rock (Feel It)"
 Pat & Mick - "I Haven't Stopped Dancing Yet"

CD/Record/Tape 2

 Mike + The Mechanics - "The Living Years"
 Gloria Estefan and Miami Sound Machine - "Can't Stay Away from You"
 Luther Vandross - "Come Back"
 Alyson Williams - "Sleep Talk"
 Rick Astley - "Hold Me in Your Arms"
 1927 - "That's When I Think of You"
 Aretha Franklin and Elton John - "Through the Storm"
 Deacon Blue - "Wages Day"
 Guns N' Roses - "Sweet Child o' Mine"
 Will to Power - "Baby, I Love Your Way/Freebird Medley"
 Johnny Nash - "I Can See Clearly Now (Remix)"
 The The - "The Beat(en) Generation"
 Pop Will Eat Itself - "Wise Up! Sucker"
 Roachford - "Cuddly Toy"
 Beatmasters with MC Merlin - "Who's in the House (The Hip House Anthem)"
 Edelweiss - "Bring Me Edelweiss"

The Hits 10 Video Selection 
 Deacon Blue - "Wages Day"
 Pop Will Eat Itself - "Wise Up! Sucker"
 Roachford - "Cuddly Toy"
 Simply Red - "If You Don't Know Me by Now"
 Robert Howard and Kym Mazelle - "Wait"
 The Funky Worm - "U + Me = Love"
 The Bangles - "Eternal Flame"
 Coldcut featuring Lisa Stansfield - "People Hold On"
 London Boys - "Requiem"
 Fuzzbox - "Pink Sunshine"
 Gloria Estefan and Miami Sound Machine - "Can't Stay Away from You"
 Luther Vandross - "Come Back"
 Alyson Williams - "Sleep Talk"
 Rick Astley - "Hold Me in Your Arms"
 1927 - "That's When I Think of You"
 Will to Power - "Baby, I Love Your Way/Freebird Medley"

References 

Collins Complete UK Hit Albums 1956-2005. Graham Betts. 2005. .

1989 compilation albums
CBS Records compilation albums
Warner Music Group compilation albums
Hits (compilation series) albums